Rosales is used as a name in historic and current Spanish countries:
 José de Patiño y Rosales  (1666–1736), Spanish statesman 
 José Rosales Herrador (1827–1891), Provisional President of El Salvador from 18 June 1885 to 22 June 1885
 Vicente Pérez Rosales (1807–1886), Spanish politician and traveller
 Joaquín Bernardo Calvo Rosales (1799–1865), Costa Rican politician

 Adam Rosales, an American baseball player
 Albenis Antonio Rosales (born 1983), Venezuelan judoka
 Alberto Rosales Orellana (born 1983) Salvadorian Photographer
 Andrea Rosales Castillejos (born 1991), Venezuelan model and beauty pageant titleholder
 Angelo Kelly-Rosales (born 1993), Honduran-American footballer 
 Antonio Ruiz-Rosales (born 1984), Mexican tennis player
 Armando Romero Rosales (born 1950), Mexican politician
 Benito Rosales, a former Nicaraguan head of state
 Brian Rosales Sarracent (born 1995), Cuban footballer 
 Carmen Rosales, a Filipino actress
 Catalina Rosales, paralympic athlete
 Celia Zaldumbide Rosales (1926–2014), Ecuadorian pianist, teacher, and cultural manager
 César Miguel Rosales Tardío (born 1970), Peruvian footballer
 Cristofer Jordan Rosales González (born 1994), Nicaraguan professional boxer
 Edmund Rosales, Filipino astronomer and meteorologist and a former president of the Philippine Astronomical Society
 Damian Rosales (born 1991), Mexican born American soccer playe
 Eduardo Rosales (1836–1873), a Spanish artist
 Elena Gallegos Rosales (1882–1954), Salvadoran-born wife of the 24th President of Costa Rica
 Elisa Ochoa (1897–1978), the first woman elected to the Philippine Congress in 1941
 Elvira Rodríguez Leonardi de Rosales, Argentine politician
 Etta Rosales, Filipino human rights activist
 Exar Javier Rosales Sánchez (born 1984), Peruvian footballer
 Fabiana Rosales Guerrero (born 1992), also known as Fabiana Rosales de Guaidó, Venezuelan journalist and social media human rights activist
 Gabe Rosales (born 1978), professional musician, sobriety advocate, international human rights activist
 Gaudencio Rosales, a Cardinal and Archbishop of Manila, Philippines
 Guillermo Rosales (1946–1993), Cuban novelist
 Harmonia Rosales, American artist
 Hector Rosales (born 1958), Uruguayan poet and writer
 Isabel Rosales Pareja (1895–1961), Ecuadorian piano prodigy
 Jaime Rosales, a Honduran football player
 Jaime Rosales (director),  Spanish film director, screenwriter and film producer
 Jennifer Rosales, a Filipino golfer
 Jericho Rosales, a Filipino actor
 Jonathan Rosales (born 1998), American soccer player
 José Luis Rosales (born 1943), Salvadoran former sports shooter
 José Manuel Ramírez Rosales (1804–1877), Chilean painter 
 Julio Rosales, a Cardinal Archbishop of Cebu, Philippines
 Jūratė Regina Statkutė de Rosales, Lithuanian-born Venezuelan journalist and researcher. 
 Kris Rosales (born 1990), Filipino-American professional basketball player
 Leo Rosales, an American baseball player
 Lina Rosales (born 1928), Spanish film and television actress
 Luis Alberto Rosales Ortíz (born 1998), Mexican footballer 
 Luis Rosales, a Spanish poet
 Luis Ortiz Rosales, a Spanish graphic artist 
 Manuel Rosales, a Venezuelan politician
 Mauricio Rosales (born 1992), Argentine professional footballer
 Mauro Rosales, an Argentine football player
 Mayra Rosales (born 1980), American woman known for being, at one point, the heaviest living woman
 Manuel Rosales (organ builder), American organ builder
 Michel Rosales (born 1983), Mexican professional boxer
 Miguel Angel Rosales, a Guatemalan-born architect and urban designer
 Miguel Rosales (born 1961), principal designer of Rosales + Partners, an architecture firm based in Boston
 Milangela Rosales (born 1987), Venezuelan race walker
 Paulo Rosales (born 1984), Argentine footballer 
 Reynaldo Rosales, an American actor
 Ricardo Rosales (footballer) (born 1993), Argentine-born Chilean professional footballer
 Ricardo Rosales (politician) (1934–2020), the former head of the Guatemalan Party of Labour
 RJ Rosales, a Filipino-Australian singer and actor
 Roberto Rosales, a Venezuelan football player
 Rosa Rosales, American political activist
 Rubén Alonso Rosales (1925–2000), a Salvadoran political figure
 Samuel Rosales Olmos, Mexican politician 
 Saudy Rosales Beneditt (born 1985), Costa Rican former footballer
 Sergio Rosales, a Venezuelan conductor
 Thomas Rosales, Jr., an American stuntman
 Ulises Rosales del Toro, a Cuban general
 Víctor Rosales (1776–1817), Mexican military 
 Victor Vazquez Rosales, Spanish footballer
 Voltaire Y. Rosales, a Filipino judge
 William Rosales Pérez (1954–2013), Puerto Rican politician

See also
 Rosas (surname), a which Rosales is a spelling variation